Sergeant Robert Allen Owens (September 13, 1920 – November 1, 1943) was a United States Marine who was killed in action in the Pacific campaign of World War II.  He was posthumously awarded his nation's highest military award — the Medal of Honor — for his heroic actions on his first day in combat at Bougainville.  The commanding general of the 3rd Marine Division described Owens' heroism — "Among many brave acts on the beachhead of Bougainville, no other single act saved the lives of more of his comrades or served to contribute so much to the success of the landings."

Early years
Robert Allen Owens was born in Greenville, South Carolina, on September 13, 1920. The family later moved to Spartanburg, which young Owens listed as his home town. After two years in high school, he went to work as a textile worker in a neighboring town. He worked at that for five years before his enlistment in the Marine Corps on February 10, 1942.

Marine Corps service
In 1942, Owens went through recruit training at Parris Island, South Carolina, and then Owens continued his training with the  1st Training Battalion of the 1st Marine Division, then located in New River, North Carolina. In June, the unit's designation was changed to Company A, 1st Battalion, 3rd Marines, 3rd Marine Division. The Division left the South Pacific  and the 3rd Marines' first overseas station at Tutuila, American Samoa, in September 1942. Later they went to New Zealand and Guadalcanal to train for their first combat assignment. After 21 months of training, Owens would see his first and only combat mission.

Medal of Honor action
On November 1, 1943, the Marine amphibious landing at Cape Torokina, Bougainville, was strongly resisted by the sole piece of artillery available to the Japanese defenders, a well-camouflaged 75 millimeter regimental gun. Strategically placed and protected within a coconut log bunker, the gun had already destroyed four landing craft and damaged ten others, seriously threatening the success of the operation. No boats could approach the beach without passing within 150 yards or less from the muzzle. The emplacement was so situated that it could only be attacked from the front and also in a position whereby rifle fire and grenades could not reach the gun crew.

Sizing up the situation, Sgt Owens decided that the only way to neutralize the gun was to charge it directly from the front. Calling on four volunteers to assist him, he positioned them where they could place supporting bunkers under fire. At the moment when he judged he had a fair chance of reaching his objective, the six-feet-three, 232-pound Marine charged right into the very mouth of the still rapidly firing cannon. Entering the emplacement through the fire port, he chased the Japanese out the back where they were cut down by his rifleman. Pursuing them, he in turn was instantly killed.

It was discovered that a round had been placed in the chamber and the breech was almost closed at the moment that Sgt Owens came through the fire port. Over 150 rounds of high-explosive shells were stacked and ready for firing. The enemy had counted heavily on this weapon to stop the Marine landing. They made several determined but fruitless efforts to recapture the piece. Maj Gen Allen H. Turnage, Commanding General of the 3rd Marine Division, said, "Among many brave acts on the beachhead of Bougainville, no other single act saved the lives of more of his comrades or served to contribute so much to the success of the landings."

Posthumous recognitions
General Alexander A. Vandegrift, then Commandant of the Marine Corps, and Maj Gen Turnage so strongly recommended the Medal of Honor for Sgt Owens, who had already received the Navy Cross posthumously, that the case was reviewed and the generals' recommendations were adopted. The medal was presented to the hero's father at his home in Drayton, South Carolina, on August 12, 1945, by Maj Gen Clayton B. Vogel, then Commanding General at Parris Island.

Initially buried in the Army, Navy, and Marine Corps Cemetery on Bougainville, Sgt Owens' remains were later reinterred in the Manila American Cemetery formally  Fort McKinley U.S. Military Cemetery .

Medal of Honor citation
The President of the United States takes pride in presenting the MEDAL OF HONOR posthumously to

for service as set forth in the following CITATION:
For conspicuous gallantry and intrepidity at the risk of his life above and beyond the call of duty while serving with a marine division, in action against enemy Japanese forces during extremely hazardous landing operations at Cape Torokina, Bougainville, Solomon Islands, on 1 November 1943. Forced to pass within disastrous range of a strongly protected, well-camouflaged Japanese 75-mm. regimental gun strategically located on the beach, our landing units were suffering heavy losses in casualties and boats while attempting to approach the beach, and the success of the operations was seriously threatened. Observing the ineffectiveness of marine rifle and grenade attacks against the incessant, devastating fire of the enemy weapon and aware of the urgent need for prompt action, Sgt. Owens unhesitatingly determined to charge the gun bunker from the front and, calling on 4 of his comrades to assist him, carefully placed them to cover the fire of the 2 adjacent hostile bunkers. Choosing a moment that provided a fair opportunity for passing these bunkers, he immediately charged into the mouth of the steadily firing cannon and entered the emplacement through the fire port, driving the guncrew out of the rear door and insuring their destruction before he himself was wounded. Indomitable and aggressive in the face of almost certain death, Sgt. Owens silenced a powerful gun which was of inestimable value to the Japanese defense and, by his brilliant initiative and heroic spirit of self-sacrifice, contributed immeasurably to the success of the vital landing operations. His valiant conduct throughout reflects the highest credit upon himself and the U.S. Naval Service.
/S/ HARRY S. TRUMAN

Namesake
The , launched on January 28, 1948, a U.S. Navy Gearing class destroyer, was named in honor of Sgt Owens.

See also

List of Medal of Honor recipients

References
Inline

General

Further reading
.  Describes the battle at Bougainville.

.

External links

1920 births
1943 deaths
United States Marine Corps Medal of Honor recipients
Recipients of the Navy Cross (United States)
People from Greenville, South Carolina
United States Marine Corps non-commissioned officers
United States Marine Corps personnel killed in World War II
Textile workers
World War II recipients of the Medal of Honor
Burials at the Manila American Cemetery
Military personnel from South Carolina